The Lott Carey Foreign Mission Convention was a movement in the 1890s by African-American Baptists of the National Baptist Convention, USA, Inc. who wanted to see more missions to Africa.  The group eventually separated from the 'Mother Church' in 1897 due to disputes concerning the mission board. They chose to have greater cooperation with the white-dominated Southern Baptist Convention.

The convention was named for Lott Carey (1780-1828), an African American who was the first American Baptist missionary to Africa. Born into slavery, he bought his freedom while working in Richmond, Virginia, and later became a Baptist preacher. While serving in the colony in West Africa that developed as Liberia, founded by the American Colonization Society in the early 19th century for the resettlement of free blacks, he engaged in evangelism and education.

In addition, Carey established the first Baptist church there in 1822. It was named the Providence Baptist Church of Monrovia, the city that became the capital of the country.

See also 

 Clinton Caldwell Boone
 Eva Roberta Coles Boone

References

External links
 Lott Carey Baptist Foreign Mission Convention
 Somerville School, Noida, India
 Somerville School, Greater Noida, India

Baptist missionary societies
Baptist denominations in North America
Historically African-American Christian denominations